Nitratiruptor sp. (strain SB155-2) is a genus of deep sea gram-negative Campylobacterota isolated from Iheya North Hydrothermal field in Okinawa Trough (Japan). This rod-shaped microorganism (0.5 x 1.5 µm) grows chemolithoautotrophically in a wide variety of electron donors and acceptors (i.e. sulfur, hydrogen, oxygen and nitrate) in absence of light and oxygen. It is also a thermophilic group capable of growing within the range of 37–65 °C with the optimal at 55 °C.

Genetic features 

Nitratiruptor sp. genome is composed by a single circular chromosome of 1,877,931 bp with the GC content of 43.8% and 39.7%. Due to the geochemical variability in the deep-sea hydrothermal vents, Nitratiruptor sp. displays a metabolic versatility to adapt to this hostile environments which includes sharp gradients in energy sources, electron acceptors or carbon sources. For instance, due to the metal-rich fluids characterizing this areas, a total of 17 genes related with transports systems and detoxification mechanisms of heavy metals (including As, Cd and Cu) were described. Despite this not being a pathogenic bacterium, it possess some virulence genes (including virulence factor mviN, hemolysin or N-linked glycosylation gene cluster) which provide insights into the origins of virulence in their pathogenic relatives, Helicobacter and Campylobacter species.

References 

Campylobacterota
Lithoautotrophs
Bacteria genera
Monotypic bacteria genera